Armona can refer to:
Armona, California
Armona Union School District
Armona, Tennessee
Armona Island, Algarve, Portugal
Armona River, Lithuania